Events in the year 1949 in India.

Incumbents
 King of India – George VI 
 Governor-General of the Union of India – C. Rajagopalachari 
 Prime Minister of India – Jawaharlal Nehru

Events
 National income - 92,908 million

January - June 
 1 January – After eight months of fighting between the Indian forces and the Pakistan Army agreed to a ceasefire, ordered by the United Nations Security Council, takes effect in Kashmir region.
 1 January – The Reserve Bank of India was nationalized.
 30 March - Fifteen Princely states joined to form Greater Rajasthan.
 28 April – India issues the London Declaration, enabling it (and, thereafter, any other nation) to remain in the British Commonwealth despite becoming a republic, creating the position of 'Head of the Commonwealth', and renaming the organisation as the 'Commonwealth of Nations'.
 6 June – With the passage of the Bodh Gaya Temple Act by the Indian government, Mahabodhi Temple is restored to partial Buddhist control.

July - September 
 27 July – India and Pakistan sign the Karachi Agreement
 9 September – Queen Kanchanprabha Devi signs the Tripura Merger Agreement.
 17 September - Dravida Munnetra Kazhagam a linguistic regional party based in Tamil Nadu formed.
 18 September - Indian rupee suffers devaluation due to 30% devaluation of Pound sterling by Chancellor of the Exchequer.
 21 September - Manipur (princely state) merges with India following agreement between V. P. Menon and Bodhchandra Singh.

October - December 
 11 October - Prime Minister of India Jawaharlal Nehru arrived at Washington, D.C. for a three week visit in United States.
 15 October – Tripura becomes a part of the Union of India
 15 November – Nathuram Godse and Narayan Apte executed for assassinating Mahatma Gandhi.
 26 November - Constituent Assembly of India adopted the Constitution of India.
 22 December - Planting of ram idol inside Babri Masjid by Abhiram Das.
 28 December – Central Reserve Police Force Act enacted.

Law
 Constitution is adopted by the Indian Constituent Assembly.
 Central Reserve Police Force Act
Electricity Act
Police Act
Banking Regulation Act
Maharaja Sayajirao University of Baroda Act
Industrial Disputes (Banking and Insurance Companies) Act
Central Reserve Police Force Act
Mangrol and Manavadar (Administration of Property) Act
Seaward Artillery Practice Act
Chartered Accountants Act
Payment Of Taxes (Transfer Of Property) Act
Abducted Persons (Recovery and Restoration) Act

Births
13 January – Rakesh Sharma, Indian Air Force pilot and cosmonaut.
7 March – Ghulam Nabi Azad, politician.
4 April – Parveen Babi, actress (died 2005).
1 June 
 T. M. Abraham, theatre director.
 Gautam Chattopadhyay, musicologist and film maker, founder member of Moheener Ghoraguli. (died 1999)
21 August – Ahmed Patel, politician (died 2020).
23 August – Bansi Kaul, theatre director (died 2021)
30 October – Pramod Mahajan, politician (died 2006).
12 December – Gopinath Munde, politician (died 2014).

Deaths
2 March - Sarojini Naidu, Activism, (aged 70 years)
10 April – Birbal Sahni, paleobotanist (born 1891).
19 June – Syed Zafarul Hasan, Muslim philosopher (born 1885).
15 November – Narayan Apte, accomplice in assassination of Mahatma Gandhi, executed (born 1911).
15 November – Nathuram Godse, assassin of Mahatma Gandhi, executed (born 1910).

See also 
 Bollywood films of 1949

References

 
India
Years of the 20th century in India